Lewitzrand is a municipality  in the Ludwigslust-Parchim district, in Mecklenburg-Vorpommern, Germany. It was created on 7 June 2009 by the merger of the former municipalities Matzlow-Garwitz, Raduhn and Klinken.

References

Ludwigslust-Parchim